Series 47 of University Challenge began on 17 July 2017 on BBC Two.

Results
Winning teams are highlighted in bold.
Teams with green scores (winners) returned in the next round, while those with red scores (losers) were eliminated.
Teams with orange scores had to win one more match to return in the next round.
Teams with yellow scores indicate that two further matches had to be played and won (teams that lost their first quarter-final match).
A score in italics indicates a match decided on a tie-breaker question.

First round

Highest Scoring Losers play-offs

Second round

Quarter-finals

Semi-finals

Final

 The trophy and title were awarded to the St John's College, Cambridge team comprising John-Clark Levin, Rosie McKeown, James Devine-Stoneman and Matt Hazell.
 The trophy was presented by Judith Weir.

Spin-off: Christmas Special 2017

Qualification round 
Each year, a Christmas special sequence is aired featuring distinguished alumni. Out of 7 first-round winners, the top 4 highest-scoring teams progress to the semi-finals. The teams consist of celebrities who represent their alma maters.
 Teams with green scores won their match and achieved a high enough score to return in the next round, teams with red scores lost and were eliminated.
 Teams with grey scores won their first round match but did not achieve a high enough score to return.

Standings for the winners

Semi-finals

Final

The winning Keble College, Oxford team consisted of Paul Johnson, Frank Cottrell-Boyce, Katy Brand and Anne-Marie Imafidon beat the University of Reading and their team of Anna Machin, Martin Hughes-Games, Sophie Walker and Pippa Greenwood.

References

External links
University Challenge homepage
Blanchflower Results Table

2017
2017 British television seasons
2018 British television seasons